Trechus larisae is a species of ground beetle in the subfamily Trechinae. It was described by Igor Alexandrowich Belousov and Ilya Igorevitsh Kabak in 1996.

References

larisae
Beetles described in 1996